Frozen is a play by Bryony Lavery that tells the story of the disappearance of a 10-year-old girl, Rhona Shirley. The play follows Rhona's mother and killer over the years that follow. They are linked by a doctor who is studying what causes men to commit such crimes. The themes of the play include emotional paralysis and forgiveness.

In 2019, Frozen was listed in The Independent as one of the 40 best plays ever written.

Productions
The play was first performed at Birmingham Repertory Theatre in 1998 and won the Best New Play Award from the Theatrical Management Association. It later made its debut at the National Theatre's Cottesloe Theatre on 3 July 2002.

The play was revived at the Theatre Royal Haymarket starring Jason Watkins, Suranne Jones and Nina Sosanya for a strictly limited season from February 2018.

Frozen opened Off-Broadway in February 2004 at the Manhattan Class Company Theatre starring Swoosie Kurtz, Brían F. O'Byrne and Laila Robins. It transferred to Broadway in May and closed in August 2004. Frozen was nominated for a Tony Award for Best Play in 2004, and earned a Tony Award for Best Featured Actor in a Play (Brían F. O'Byrne).

Plot and characters
The story is set in present-day England and involves three main characters: a serial killer named Ralph Wantage, who kidnaps and murders a young girl; the murdered girl's mother, Nancy Shirley; a New York psychiatrist, Agnetha Gottmundsdottir, who travels to England to examine Ralph. The three lives slowly intersect — and the characters gradually change and become "unfrozen" as they come to terms with the idea of forgiveness.

The script begins in monologues, each person showing his or her side of the story; the audience sees each person's story intertwine as they connect with one another.

Allegations of plagiarism
In September 2004, media sources around the world (including The Times, The Observer, The New York Times, and the Associated Press) reported allegations that Lavery had plagiarized significant portions (nearly 675 words) of the play from a 1997 The New Yorker article by Malcolm Gladwell about psychiatrist Dorothy Lewis, and from Lewis' own book Guilty by Reason of Insanity (1998).

Lewis claimed that Frozen was based in large part on her life and that the play lifted both themes and verbatim passages from both sources. However, after interviewing Lavery, Gladwell wrote a second New Yorker article in which he characterized Lavery's appropriation as "permissible borrowing." Lavery, for her part, acknowledged that all three characters were drawn heavily from external sources. For the character of Ralph, she drew on the book The Murder of Childhood by Ray Wyre and Tim Tate. For the character of Nancy, she drew on an article in The Guardian by Marian Partington, whose sister Lucy had been murdered by the serial killers Fred and Rosemary West. And, for the character of Agnetha, Lavery drew on the Gladwell article. "I wanted [the play] to be accurate", she told Gladwell.

Reviews
"[A] big, brave, compassionate play about grief, revenge, forgiveness and bearing the unbearable." -- The Guardian

The TalkinBroadway reviewer of a Florida production wrote: "[A] powerful drama ... about three people living the human condition... a story that needs to continue to be told."

Notes

References
Malcolm Gladwell, ""Damaged"", The New Yorker, February 24, 1997
Tony-nominated playwright Bryony Lavery accused of plagiarism, Associated Press, September 25, 2004
Jesse McKinley, Playwright Created a Psychiatrist By Plagiarizing One, Accusers Say, New York Times, September 25, 2004, Page B-1
Malcolm Gladwell, Something Borrowed: Should a charge of plagiarism ruin your life?, The New Yorker, November 22, 2004

External links
 
 

2004 plays
British plays
Works involved in plagiarism controversies